More than 80 anti-nuclear groups are operating, or have operated, in the United States. These include Abalone Alliance, Clamshell Alliance, Greenpeace USA,  Institute for Energy and Environmental Research, Musicians United for Safe Energy, Nevada Desert Experience, Nuclear Control Institute, Nuclear Information and Resource Service, Public Citizen Energy Program, Shad Alliance, and the Sierra Club. These are direct action, environmental, health, and public interest organizations who oppose nuclear weapons and/or nuclear power. In 1992, the chairman of the Nuclear Regulatory Commission said that "his agency had been pushed in the right direction on safety issues because of the pleas and protests of nuclear watchdog groups".

Some of the most influential groups in the anti-nuclear movement have had members who included Nobel Laureates (e.g., Linus Pauling and Hermann Joseph Muller). These scientists have belonged primarily to two groups: the Federation of American Scientists, and the Committee for Nuclear Responsibility.

Specific groups
Groups include:

See also 
Anti-nuclear protests in the United States
Environmental movement in the United States
List of anti-nuclear groups
List of books about nuclear issues
List of companies in the nuclear sector
List of nuclear power groups
Nuclear accidents in the United States
Nuclear energy policy
Nuclear power in the United States
Nuclear safety in the U.S.
Nuclear whistleblowers

References

Further reading
Falk, Jim (1982). Global Fission:The Battle Over Nuclear Power, Oxford University Press.
Jasper, James M. (1997). The Art of Moral Protest: Culture, Biography, and Creativity in Social Movements, University of Chicago Press, 
Natti, Susanna and Acker, Bonnie (1979). No nukes: Everyone's guide to nuclear power.
Ondaatje, Elizabeth H. (c1988). Trends in antinuclear protests in the United States, 1984–1987.
Peterson, Christian (2003). Ronald Reagan and Antinuclear Movements in the United States and Western Europe, 1981–1987.
Polletta, Francesca (2002). Freedom Is an Endless Meeting: Democracy in American Social Movements, University of Chicago Press, 
Smith, Jennifer  (Editor), (2002). The Antinuclear Movement.
Wellock, Thomas R. (1998). Critical Masses: Opposition to Nuclear Power in California, 1958–1978, The University of Wisconsin Press,

External links
A Question of Power documentary film
Filming the anti-nuke movement

groups
 
Political movements in the United States
Nuclear history of the United States
Nuclear technology-related lists